"Kill Bill" is a song by American singer-songwriter SZA from her second studio album, SOS (2022). The song gets its title from Kill Bill: Volume 1 (2003) and Volume 2 (2004), a martial arts film duology that focuses on an assassin named the Bride and her quest to exact revenge on her ex-boyfriend by murdering him. Mirroring the films' plot, the song's lyrics discuss SZA's fantasy to kill an ex-boyfriend and his new girlfriend out of jealousy. "Kill Bill" is a pop and R&B song built around a midtempo, groovy rhythm and a detuned melody. It is backed by electric bass, guitars, and a flute sample produced from a Sequential prophet 6 synthesizer.

Critics praised "Kill Bill" for its candid exploration of SZA's unfiltered, violent emotions. They found her murder fantasies extreme but relatable to a degree, due to its underlying sentiments of doing whatever it takes for love. Bolstered by its success on streaming services, "Kill Bill" surpassed "Kiss Me More" as SZA's highest-charting song in the United States, peaking at number 2 for seven weeks, and it became her first number one on the US Streaming Songs and Billboard Global 200 charts. The song reached the top 10 in over 10 territories worldwide, with number one peaks in six countries. RCA Records promoted "Kill Bill" to US radio on January 10, 2023, as the fifth single from SOS, attributing the decision to its streaming numbers.

A music video for the song premiered on the same day. Directed by Christian Breslauer, it reimagines several scenes from the Kill Bill films, featuring SZA as a rendition of the Bride and Vivica A. Fox, one of the actresses who starred in the duology, in a supporting role. The video ends as SZA confronts her ex-boyfriend and pulls his heart out, killing him. When she debuted the song on a 19-show North American tour in support of SOS, she recreated her costume in the music video, and she had a spiked ball and chain in hand that she swung across the stage. The prop was a callback to one scene in Volume 1, where the Bride fought an antagonist who tried to kill her with a meteor hammer.

Background

SZA released her debut studio album, Ctrl, in 2017. Primarily an R&B album that deals with themes like heartbreak, Ctrl received widespread acclaim for its vocal performances and eclectic musical style, as well as the relatability, emotional impact, and confessional nature of its songwriting. The album brought SZA to mainstream fame, and critics credit it with establishing her status as a major figure in contemporary pop and R&B music and pushing the boundaries of the R&B genre.

SZA alluded to potentially releasing her second album as early as August 2019 during an interview with DJ Kerwin Frost. Commenting on the creative process behind the album, she stated it would be as candid and personal as Ctrl: "This next album is even more of me being less afraid of who am I when I have no choice? When I'm not out trying to curate myself and contain." When SZA collaborated with Cosmopolitan for their February 2021 issue, she spoke about her creative process behind the album's conception. She said: "this album is going to be the shit that made me feel something in my...here and in here", pointing to her heart and gut.

One of the tracks from the album, which is named SOS, is called "Kill Bill". The song gets its title from Kill Bill: Volume 1 (2003) and Volume 2 (2004), a martial arts film duology directed by Quentin Tarantino. The plot centers on an assassin named the Bride and her plans to murder Bill, the head of the enemy Deadly Viper assassins and a former love interest who tried to have her killed on the day she was about to be wed to someone else. While watching the films, Bill in particular caught SZA's attention, and found him a complex and nuanced character: "I feel like he doesn't understand why he did what he did. He's void of emotion, but he loved the Bride so much that he couldn't stand her to be with anyone else."

Composition

Music and production 
Music journalists have described "Kill Bill" as predominantly pop and R&B, drawing from associated genres such as psychedelic pop, pop-soul, and doo-wop. It prominently features basic eighth notes and incorporates a midtempo, groovy rhythm and a detuned melody. The song was produced by Rob Bisel and Carter Lang. While work on SOS had begun by 2019, "Kill Bill" was recorded in 2022 alongside a significant number of other tracks due to bursts of productivity from time pressure. Lang commented, "that's when [we] started feeling like, hey, 'We gotta do this shit like, it's been some years.' We bottled up that energy and everything was just sort of a preparation for that moment." Making "Kill Bill", in SZA's words, took "one take, one night".

Production began when Bisel recorded a sample of a flute from Sequential prophet 6 synthesizer. He sent the audio clip, which had the working title "Igloo", to Lang, who created the song's rhythm starting with boom bap–style drums. The remaining instruments, the guitar and electric bass, were added after the drums. A number of weeks later, SZA asked Bisel to play the song's beat while they were alone in the studio for recording sessions. Humming vocal melodies, she began writing the hook on her phone, and she turned to Bisel to say about the lyrics, "I have an idea. This might be a little too crazy, but let me know what you think."

Lyrics 
SZA told Glamour in 2022 that many songs in SOS centered around themes of revenge, heartbreak, and "being pissed". She added, "I've never raged the way that I should have. This is my villain era, and I'm very comfortable with that. It is in the way I say no[...] It's in the fucked up things that I don't apologize for." In the lyrics to "Kill Bill", SZA expresses resentment towards her former boyfriend after a breakup whilst at the same time trying to keep herself composed by looking at the situation from a rational perspective. The song's premise is heavily based on the Kill Bill films, in that it follows SZA as she plans to take vengeance on her ex-boyfriend through murder.  SZA sings the lyrics with a soft, croon-like voice, which creates a juxtaposition between the innocent tone of her vocal melodies and the violent nature of the lyrics.

In spite of her hatred and jealousy, SZA's love for her ex-boyfriend persists, exploring how intense love and intense vitriol towards somebody can often coexist with one another. She tries to navigate her issues through consultations with a therapist, which leads her to think she is mature and mockingly congratulates herself for it. Even though her therapist has advised her to seek other men, she loves him to such a degree that she would still rather be with him than anyone else. SZA sings that if she cannot have him back, then "no one should"; what follows is the chorus, in which she fantasizes about killing him and his new girlfriend. She acknowledges that it is a bad idea and wonders: "how'd I get here?"

As the song progresses, she begins to plan out her revenge—she carefully peruses old text messages with her ex-boyfriend that might implicate her in the murder. Come the final chorus, she has proceeded with the double homicide, and she reasons that going to jail is a better fate than being alone. SZA furthers justifies her actions by saying she murdered her ex-boyfriend out of love. In the last line of the final chorus, and the last line of the song, she admits she would rather go to hell than live without him. Due to the lyrics' violent nature, some radio stations played a censored version of "Kill Bill" with the word "kill" replaced with the sound of a slashing blade.

Critical reception
Zoe Guy at Vulture noted the song for being an integral part of "an arsenal of pop-culture references" throughout the album and pointed out the "already well-seasoned lyrics about growing up". Steffanee Wang of Nylon chose the track as the top essential song of the album, praising the artist's ability to showcase her own emotions through "unspooling diaristic toxic thoughts and worst case scenarios". Pitchforks Julianne Escobedo Shepherd referred to the song as a "stalker lullaby" that the singer uses to convey "all her darkest thoughts". Jon Pareles of The New York Times thought that Rowe sounded "both lighthearted and dangerous" on this "plush R&B ballad".

Discussing why the song became commercially successful and warmly received by critics and fans, Billboard writers pointed towards the emotional impact of its songwriting. They found the melodramatic nature of "Kill Bill" fun and wrote that although the sentiments echoed in the lyrics were extreme, there was a degree of relatability to the song's exploration of violence for the sake of love. As one of them, Cydney Lee, wrote: "while I obviously am not encouraging anyone to act on this, what woman (especially) hasn't emotionally been there before?? Also, people just love violence, and seem to have a weird fascination with 'crazy in love' relationship dynamics — and with it being track two on SOS, it almost felt like it was setting the tone for the album."

Commercial performance 
"Kill Bill" was a success on streaming services, with two weeks atop the Billboard Global 200 chart and four weeks atop the US Streaming Songs chart. It was SZA's first song to top the Billboard Global 200, and it did so in early January 2023, bolstered by around 64million international streams. It debuted within the top 5 three weeks prior with around 57.9million streams, 36.9million of which were from the United States. With these first-week US streaming figures, "Kill Bill" debuted atop Streaming Songs on the issue dated December 24, 2022, and marked her first number 1 song there. It became the first non-holiday song since 2018 to be the top entry on the chart for the week of Christmas.

With "Kill Bill" and "Nobody Gets Me", another track from the album, SZA acquired her sixth and seventh top 10 songs in the United States. Marking SZA's highest chart debut in the country, "Kill Bill" entered the Billboard Hot 100 at number three, and spent seven weeks at its peak of number two; it surpassed her Doja Cat collaboration "Kiss Me More" (2021) to become the highest-peaking song of her career. "Kill Bill" topped Hot R&B/Hip-Hop Songs for ten consecutive weeks and was her second number-one debut there after "I Hate U" in 2021. Once the song started to receive radio airplay, it reached the top 10 of US Radio Songs, her first solo song to do so. Meanwhile in Canada, it debuted at number 5 and later peaked at number 4.

The song had several top 5 peaks in the Asia-Pacific and the Middle East and North Africa (MENA) regions. "Kill Bill" spent multiple weeks at number one in New Zealand and Singapore, and it was the highest-charting international song in Malaysia for over a week. It also went number one in Indonesia and the Philippines, and it reached number 4 and number 3 in Vietnam and the MENA's regional chart, respectively. "Kill Bill" marked SZA's first chart-topping song in Australia, where it was certified double platinum for selling over 140,000 units. It received another platinum certification in New Zealand for selling over 30,000 units.

In mid–December 2022, "Kill Bill" debuted within the top 15 of the UK Singles Chart. It became SZA's first top 10 solo song in the United Kingdom at the beginning of 2023, once December ended and Christmas songs began leaving the chart. It peaked at number 3 around the same time in Ireland; the following week, "Kill Bill" reached a new peak of number 3 in the UK Singles Chart, with 35,780 sales recorded during the tracking period. It ties "Kiss Me More" as her highest-charting song in the country. Elsewhere in Europe, "Kill Bill" was a top 20 song in the Nordic countries, Lithuania, Portugal, Slovakia, Switzerland, Hungary, the Netherlands, Germany, and Austria.

Release  
From April to May 2022, SZA told media outlets that she had recently finished the album in Hawaii and said it was coming soon. During a Billboard cover story published in November, SZA revealed the album title and release date, which was scheduled sometime next month. On December 5, 2022, she posted the album's track list on Twitter, and SOS was released four days later. Out of 23 songs, "Kill Bill" appears as the second track; following its success on streaming platforms, RCA Records chose it as the next radio single from the album.

RCA and Top Dawg Entertainment sent the song to US pop, rhythmic, and urban radio on January 10, 2023, as the fifth single from SOS. Originally, only "Nobody Gets Me" was scheduled to impact pop radio on January 10. However, RCA and various radio programmers eventually decided to promote the two songs simultaneously despite the intricacies of planning dual singles, citing the large streaming numbers that "Kill Bill" gained in December and the radio-friendly appeal of the lyrics and production. "Kill Bill" became one of the week's most-added songs on pop and rhythmic formats, with 2,257 plays from 129 pop radio stations. Top Dawg and RCA pushed it to R&B radio stations three weeks later.

On January 13, 2023, Top Dawg and RCA released a four-track bundle of the song to digital download and streaming platforms. Apart from the original version of "Kill Bill", the release contains a sped-up version, an instrumental version, and an a cappella version. An acoustic version of the song, with a different cover art, was released on January 24. The sped-up version capitalizes and is based on a viral trend on TikTok where users would increase the pitch and tempo of certain songs and post them on the application. One user shared a sped-up audio of "Kill Bill" upon the release of SOS, and it was viewed over 21.7million times, liked over 1.9million times, and reposted in over 1.1million videos, boosting streams for the song.

Music video

Background 

SZA expressed her gratitude for fans' warm reception of "Kill Bill" by posting a 20-second teaser of the music video to Twitter on December 29, 2022, having alluded to its creation around a week prior during an interview with Entertainment Weekly. The video was directed by Christian Breslauer and produced by Luga Podesta through his production company London Alley Entertainment. It premiered on YouTube on the same day as the song's release, briefly going private after its first 10 minutes of availability before being made public again.

With the video, SZA aimed to create something more narrative-centric compared to her past music videos which, while containing a few story beats, did not have full, coherent plotlines. In Breslauer's words, she wanted "less performance and [more] acting"; the result was a short action film heavily inspired by the Kill Bill duology. The music video recreates several scenes and plot points from the duology and features Vivica A. Fox, the actress who starred in Kill Bill as a Deadly Viper and the Bride's enemy Vernita Green, in a secondary role. Meanwhile, SZA appears as a recreation of the Bride's character. She appears in a red and black jumpsuit similar to the Bride's yellow and black one, and she uses a katana as her fighting weapon.

Pre-production began in the middle of December 2022, when Top Dawg approached London Alley to produce the video, and principal photography took place six days later. The scheduled period for filming was one day before the company's Christmas break, so all scenes had to be completed within 19 or 20 hours, in contrast to the usual two or three days allocated for similar music videos. Many of the scenes in question were split-screen shots, inspired by the cinematography of several 1970s films. Regarding this, Breslauer said: "Tarantino has kind of made his name on grabbing from all these different genres and kind of stitching them together. So we wanted to do the same thing."

SZA had prominent authority in the creative direction; for example, she performed most of her stunts despite little time to choreograph. She had been promoting specific tracks from SOS by using the outros of her music videos to tease an upcoming song, and she wanted to continue the trend with the "Kill Bill" video. Her choice for the outro song was the album track "Seek & Destroy". It contains the line "I had to do it you", which she deemed fitting because when applied in the context of "Kill Bill", the lyrics captured SZA's celebration of revenge and the glory it brought her. She asked someone with expertise in shibari to tie her upside down, wanting the scene to serve as the visuals for the outro.

Plot 
The opening scene contains the first out of many Kill Bill references, set in a trailer reminiscent of the one in which Budd, another of the Bride's sworn enemies, resided. During this, the boyfriend breaks up with SZA and leaves her in the trailer before he tells his gunmen, who act as the video's Deadly Vipers, to shoot her dead while she is inside. She survives the assault and gets in a car driven by Fox's character, who takes her to a warehouse where she prepares to enact vengeance on the hitmen. SZA dresses up in the jumpsuit, gets a katana which she uses to decapitate a dummy, and drives on a motorcycle with the intent of finding her ex-boyfriend. The scene with Fox was the last one filmed during production.

SZA arrives at a location analogous to the films' House of Blue Leaves, a Japanese bar that served as the headquarters for O-Ren Ishii, a high-ranking assassin of the Deadly Vipers. In there, she confronts several yakuza bodyguards who represent Ishii's Crazy 88, kill them one by one, and enter a room to face her ex-boyfriend. Drawn in an anime art style and added in post-production, the confrontation scene is an allusion to the animated sequence that introduced Ishii's backstory in Volume 1. The video ends as SZA approaches the man, rips his heart out, and licks it, fulfilling her revenge. A naked and tied-up SZA, hung upside down from the warehouse ceiling, appears in the outro while a snippet of "Seek & Destroy" plays, which Vulture believed was hinting at a possible music video for the song.

Live performances 
SZA debuted "Kill Bill" during a 19-show North American tour in support of SOS. Specifically, she first played the song during her concert at the Schottenstein Center in Columbus, Ohio, on February 21, 2023. When the set lists neared their end, she would change her outfit to wear red biker pants and a motor suit, recreating her look for the music video. SZA had a spiked ball and chain in hand that she swung across the stage, a callback to one scene in Volume 1 where Gogo Yubari fought the Bride at the House of Blue Leaves using a meteor hammer.

Charts

Weekly charts

Monthly charts

Certifications

Release history

See also 

 List of most-streamed songs on Spotify
 List of Billboard Global 200 number ones of 2023
 List of Billboard Streaming Songs number ones of 2022
 List of Billboard Streaming Songs number ones of 2023
 List of Billboard Hot 100 top-ten singles in 2022
 List of Billboard Hot 100 top-ten singles in 2023 
 List of number-one R&B/hip-hop songs of 2022 (U.S.)
 List of number-one R&B/hip-hop songs of 2023 (U.S.) 
 List of number-one singles of 2023 (Australia)
 List of number-one singles from the 2020s (New Zealand) 
 List of number-one songs of 2022 (Singapore)
 List of UK top-ten singles in 2023

Notes

References

2022 songs
2023 singles
2020s ballads
Billboard Global 200 number-one singles
Contemporary R&B ballads
Kill Bill
Number-one singles in Australia
Number-one singles in New Zealand
Number-one singles in the Philippines
Number-one singles in Singapore
American pop songs
Pop ballads
Murder ballads
Songs about domestic violence
Songs written by SZA
SZA songs
Top Dawg Entertainment singles
RCA Records singles